A rosette is a rose-like marking or formation found on the fur and skin of some animals, particularly cats. Rosettes are used to camouflage the animal, either as a defense mechanism or as a stalking tool. Predators use their rosettes to simulate the different shifting of shadows and shade, helping the animals to remain hidden from their prey. Rosettes can be grouped in clusters around other spots, or may appear as blotches on the fur.

Leopard 
The leopard (Panthera pardus) has a wide variety of coat coloration. On each color variation, the leopard has rosette patterns on their backs, flanks, and limbs. They also have patterns that are considered to be spots and not rosettes on their heads, stomach, and limbs.

Jaguar 
Like the leopard, the jaguar (Panthera onca) has a wide variety of coat coloration. The jaguar can have a coat in colors ranging from white to black with the most common residing in brownish yellow area. These big cats have rosettes on their bodies in random combination and pattern.

Lion (cub) 
Young lion (Panthera leo) cubs have rosette patterns on their legs and abdomen regions. These rosettes usually do not transfer into adult hood and fade as the cub ages. However, some mature lions may keep traces of their rosette patterns throughout life.  For the lion cub, the rosette 

marking act as camouflage in long grasses and bushes.

Bengal Cat 

The bengal cat (Felis catus x Prionailurus bengalensis) is a descendent from a combination of domestic cats and Asian leopard lineage. This domesticated cat has a distinct coat pattern with a combination of rosettes, spots, and stripes.

Cheetah 

While individual cheetahs (Acinonyx jubatus) do have distinct and identifiable coat patterns like leopards or jaguars, the cheetah’s patterns are considered to be spots, not rosettes.

Ocelot 

Ocelots (leopardus pardalis) have a coat pattern that may look like rosettes, however is considered to be a combination of spots and stripes.

List of felids with rosettes 

 Cheetah – the king cheetah variety has rosettes
 Jaguar 
 Leopard – smaller, denser rosettes than the jaguar, lacking central spots
 Snow leopard
 Ocelot
 Margay
 Lion – cubs have rosettes, which may be retained on the legs in adults
 Liger
 Liliger
 Tigon
 Bengal cat
 Leopard cat

See also 
 Leopard pattern
 Stripe (pattern)

References 

Animal coat colors